An anti-aircraft vehicle, also known as a self-propelled anti-aircraft gun (SPAAG) or self-propelled air defense system (SPAD), is a mobile vehicle with a dedicated anti-aircraft capability. 

Specific weapon systems used include machine guns, autocannons, larger guns, or missiles, and some mount both guns and longer-ranged missiles (e.g. the Pantsir-S1). Platforms used include both trucks and heavier combat vehicles such as armored personnel carriers and tanks, which add protection from aircraft, artillery, and small arms fire for front line deployment.

Anti-aircraft guns are usually mounted in a quickly-traversing turret with a high rate of elevation, for tracking fast-moving aircraft. They are often in dual or quadruple mounts, allowing a high rate of fire. In addition, most anti-aircraft guns can be used in a direct-fire role against surface targets to great effect. Today, missiles (generally mounted on similar turrets) have largely supplanted anti-aircraft guns, but they may return as an cheap way to counter unmanned aerial systems (drones).

History

World War I
Anti-aircraft machine guns have long been mounted on trucks, and these were quite common during World War I. A predecessor of the WWII German "88" anti-aircraft gun, the WWI German 77 mm anti-aircraft gun, was truck-mounted and used to great effect against British tanks.

The British QF 3 inch 20 cwt was mounted on trucks for use on the Western Front. The British also had a first dedicated  anti aircraft weapon, the QF 1-pounder pom-pom. Mounted on a armoured truck titled the Pierce-Arrow armoured AA lorry, which was produced in limited numbers and only seeing service throughout 1915.

Inter-war period
Between the two World Wars, the United Kingdom developed the Birch gun, a general-purpose artillery piece on an armoured tracked chassis capable of maintaining formation with their current tanks over terrain. The gun could be elevated for anti-aircraft use.

Vickers Armstrong also developed a SPAAG based on the chassis of the  Vickers Mk.E 6-ton light tank/Dragon, Medium, Mark IV artillery tractor, mounting a Vickers QF-1 "Pom-Pom" gun of 40 mm. About 26 were sold to Siam and saw action as infantry support guns and AA guns during the Franco-Thai war (1940-1941) along with 30 Vickers Mk.E Type B 6-ton tanks. This was probably the first tracked SPAAG manufactured in series. Later the British also developed a version of the Mk.VI Light Tank armed with four machine guns that were known as Light Tank AA Mk.I. And also a twin 15 mm version based on the Light Tank Mk.V was built.

Among early pre-war pioneers of self-propelled AA guns were the Germans. By the time of the war, they fielded the Sd.Kfz. 10/4 and 6/2, cargo half-tracks mounting single 20 mm or 37 mm AA guns (respectively). Later in the war similar German half-tracks mounted quadruple 20 mm weapons.

World War II

Larger guns followed on larger trucks, but these mountings generally required off-truck setup in order to unlimber the stabilizing legs these guns needed. One exception to this rule was the Italian Cannone da 90/53 which was highly effective when mounted on trucks, a fit known as the "autocannoni da 90/53". The 90/53 was a feared weapon, notably in the anti-tank role, but only a few hundred had been produced by the time of the armistice in 1943.

Other nations tended to work on truck chassis. Starting in 1941, the British developed the "en portee" method of mounting an anti-tank gun (initially a 2 pounder) on a truck. This was to prevent the weapon from being damaged by long-distance towing across rough, stony deserts, and it was intended only to be a carrying method, with the gun unloaded for firing. However, crews tended to fire their weapons from their vehicles for the mobility this method provided, with consequent casualties.  
This undoubtedly inspired their Morris C9/B (officially the "Carrier, SP, 4x4, 40 mm AA"), a Bofors 40 mm AA gun mounted on a chassis derived from the Morris "Quad" Field Artillery Tractor truck. Similar types, based on 3-ton lorries, were produced in Britain, Canada and Australia, and together formed the most numerous self-propelled AA guns in British service.

The U.S. Army brought truck-towed Bofors 40 mm AA guns along with truck-mounted units fitted with mechanized turrets when they sailed, first for Great Britain and then onto France. The turrets carried four .50 inch (12.7 mm) machine guns, which were designed to be adjusted to converge at the single point where enemy aircraft were expected to appear at low altitude in conduction of strafing runs directed at large infantry and field artillery units.

Interest in mobile AA turned to heavier vehicles with the mass and stability needed to easily train weapons of all sizes. Probably the desire, particularly in German service, for anti-aircraft vehicles to be armoured for their own protection also assisted this trend.

The concept of an armored SPAAG was pioneered by Hungary during World War II by producing the 40M Nimrod based on the Luftvärnskanonvagn L-62 Anti II license acquired from Sweden. Germany followed later with their "Flakpanzer" series. German World War II SPAAGs include the Möbelwagen, Wirbelwind, Ostwind and Kugelblitz. Other forces followed with designs of their own, notably the American M16 created by mounting quadruple M2HB Browning machine guns on a M3 Half-track.

The British developed their own SPAAGs throughout the war mounting multiple machine guns and light cannon on various tank and armoured car chassis and by 1943, the Crusader AA tanks, which mounted the Bofors 40 mm gun or two-three Oerlikon 20 mm cannon. Although used during the Normandy landings, by that point German aircraft were contained by the Allies own air forces and they were largely unneeded.

Cold War and later

The introduction of jet engines and the subsequent rough doubling of aircraft speeds greatly reduced the effectiveness of the SPAAG against attack aircraft. This means the aircraft will have moved hundreds of meters during the flight time of the shells, greatly complicating the aiming problem to the point where close passes were essentially impossible to aim using manual gunsights. This speed also allowed the aircraft to rapidly fly out of range of the guns; even if the aircraft passes directly over the SPAAG, it would be within its firing radius for under 30 seconds.

SPAAG development continued through the early 1950s with ever-larger guns, improving the range and allowing the engagement to take place at longer distances where the crossing angle was smaller and aiming was easier. Examples including the 40 mm U.S. M42 Duster and the 57 mm Soviet ZSU-57-2. However, both were essentially obsolete before they entered service, and found employment solely in the ground-support role. The M42 was introduced to the Vietnam War to counter an expected North Vietnamese air offensive, but when this failed to materialize it was used as an effective direct-fire weapon. The ZSU-57 found similar use in the Yugoslav Wars, where its high-angle fire was useful in the mountainous terrain.

By the late 1950s, the US Army had given up on the SPAAG concept, considering all gun-based weapons to be useless against modern aircraft. This belief was generally held by many forces, and the anti-aircraft role turned almost exclusively to missile systems. The Soviet Union remained an outlier, beginning the development of a new SPAAG in 1957, which emerged as the ZSU-23-4 in 1965. This system included search-and-track radars, fire control, and automatic gun-laying, greatly increasing its effectiveness against modern targets. The ZSU-23 proved very effective when used in concert with SAMs; the presence of SAMs forced aircraft to fly low to avoid their radars, placing them within range of the ZSUs.

The success of the ZSU-23 led to a resurgence of SPAAG development. This was also prompted by the introduction of attack helicopters in the 1970s, which could hide behind terrain and then "pop up" for an attack lasting only a few tens of seconds; missiles were ineffective at low altitudes, while the helicopters would often be within range of the guns for a rapid counterattack. Notable among these later systems is the German Gepard, the first western SPAAG to offer performance equal to or better than the ZSU. This system was widely copied in various NATO forces.

SPAAG development continues, with many modern examples often combining both guns and short-range missiles. Examples include the Soviet/Russian Tunguska-M1, which supplanted the ZSU-23 in service, the newer versions of the Gepard, the Chinese Type 95 SPAAA, and the British Marksman turret, which can be used on a wide variety of platforms. Some forces, like the US Army and USMC have mostly forgone self-propelled guns in favor of systems with short-range infrared-guided surface-to-air missiles in the AN/TWQ-1 Avenger and M6 Linebacker, which do not require radar to be accurate and are generally more reliable and cost-effective to field, though their ability to provide ground support is more limited. The U.S. Army did use the M163 VADS and developed the prototype design of the M247 Sergeant York.

Present Day 

The wide spread usage of Unmanned Aerial Vehicles (UAVs or "drones") seems to bring back SPAAGs to most of the modern armies. These relatively cheap, low, slow and small targets are ideal for autocannons. Engaging these targets with expensive missiles is unsustainable on the long run, therefore SPAAGs are a much more economic way to counter the UAVs. These modern SPAAGs usually have short range missiles as well for longer range engagement. The Pantsir system from Russia is primarily a missile battery, although it does have twin cannons as secondary armament. Some examples of modern SPAAGs:

 Stryker M-SHORAD, US/Canada, 30mm
 Skyranger 30, 30mm 
 Skyranger 35, Swiss/German, 35mm
 Flakpanzer Gepard, Germany, 35mm
 PGZ-09, China, 35mm
 KORKUT, Turkey, 35mm
 Luftvärnskanonvagn (lvkv) 9040, Sweden, 40mm, 35mm, 30mm
 PASARS-16, Serbia, 40mm

See also
 4M (artillery)
 Assault gun
 Flakpanzer, a collective term for German anti-aircraft tanks, particularly those used in World War II.
 List of anti-aircraft guns
 Man-portable air-defense system
 Self-propelled artillery
 Tank destroyer

References

 
Armoured fighting vehicles by type